Swinton may refer to:

Places

England 
 Swinton, Greater Manchester
 Swinton, Harrogate, near Masham, North Yorkshire
 Swinton Estate, including Swinton Park
 Swinton, Ryedale, near Malton, North Yorkshire
 Swinton, South Yorkshire

North America 
 Swinton, Missouri, United States
 Swinton Creek Volcano, British Columbia, Canada

Scotland 
 Swinton, Glasgow
 Swinton, Scottish Borders

People 
 Swinton (surname), list of people with the family name
 Clan Swinton, a Scottish clan
 Earl of Swinton, a British title

Other uses 
 Swinton Insurance, a British insurance company
 Swinton Lions, a rugby league club based in Swinton, Greater Manchester

See also 
 John Swinton (disambiguation)
 Swindon (disambiguation)
 Swinton railway station (disambiguation)